The 2014 A Lyga, also known as SMSCredit.lt A Lyga for sponsoring purposes, is the 25th season of the A Lyga, the top-tier association football league of Lithuania. The season starts on 8 March 2014 and ends on 29 November 2014. VMFD Žalgiris Vilnius are the defending champions.

Changes from 2013 

The league changed its number of teams for the fifth time in a row, increasing it from nine teams in 2013 A Lyga to ten sides, because it 2 new clubs from I Lyga, it is FK Trakai and FK Klaipėdos Granitas. As a consequence, the schedule increased from 32 to 36 matches per team, with each team playing every other team four times in total, twice at home and twice away.

Stadiums and locations

League table

Results

First half of season

Second half of season

Top goalscorers

References

External links
Season at RSSSF
Season at soccerway.com

LFF Lyga seasons
1
Lith
Lith